Heinz Schubert (12 November 1925 – 12 February 1999) was a German actor, drama teacher and photographer, best known for playing the role of Alfred Tetzlaff in the German television sitcom Ein Herz und eine Seele.

Life 
Schubert was born in Berlin, the son of a master tailor. He went to drama school after his release from captivity as a prisoner of war.

In 1951, Bertolt Brecht asked for him directly to join his Berliner Ensemble, where Schubert remained until the Berlin Wall was erected in 1961. From then on, Schubert worked in West Germany in theatre (in Munich, Hamburg, Stuttgart and Berlin) and taught drama; he was first a docent and in 1985 was awarded a professorship at the Hochschule für Musik und Theater Hamburg.

In 1958 Schubert also started to work in film, first for DEFA productions, playing the role of the Schweizerkas that he had been known for in the Berliner Ensemble in the film version of the Brecht drama. He also acted in fairy stories and the much-loved DEFA Das Stacheltier series. From 1961, in the West, he also acted in television productions.

In 1973 Schubert was given the part for which he is best remembered, and which he later did his best to escape from: the role of Ekel Alfred ("Nasty Alfred") in the satirical ARD television series Ein Herz und eine Seele, written by Wolfgang Menge. The series was based on the British series Till Death Us Do Part by Johnny Speight; the themes it brought up and the language it used put it in the headlines and drew a huge audience. Schubert played the German equivalent to Alf Garnett or Archie Bunker, a tyrannical bigot, and appeared the part, with a hairstyle and mannerisms comparable to those used by German dictator Adolf Hitler.

Schubert also acted alongside Michael Caine in the British spy film Funeral in Berlin.

As well as his film roles, Schubert acted in an increasing number of television series, playing the private detective Fetzer in Detektivbüro Roth and Dr. Fink in the ZDF film . In 1996 he once more played the main role in a Wolfgang Menge series, again based on an idea by Johnny Speight, as Viktor Bölkhoff in Mit einem Bein im Grab. (One Foot in the Grave.)

As well as his acting career, Schubert also loved photography. He is especially well known for his many photographs of shop windows and mannequins; this work was on show at the documenta 6 in Kassel in 1977. In 1979 he published a book of these photographs, Theater im Schaufenster ("Theatre in the Shop Window").

Heinz Schubert received several awards, including the Goldene Kamera (1993) and the Adolf Grimme Award (1994). He died of pneumonia on 12 February 1999 in Hamburg, where he had acted for many years.

Partial filmography 

 Katzgraben (1957) - Günther, ein junger Bergmann
 My Wife Makes Music (1958) - Spießer
 Das Stacheltier – Der junge Engländer (1958)
 Geschichte vom armen Hassan (1958) - Wasserhändler
 Sie nannten ihn Amigo (1959) - Dicker Gestapo-Mann
 Das Feuerzeug (1959) - Der Geizige
 Mother Courage and Her Children (1961) - Schweizerkas
 Italienisches Capriccio (1961)
 On the Sunny Side (1962) - Felix Schnepf
 My Daughter and I (1963) - Detektiv
  (1964, TV Movie) - Schnabel
 Emil and the Detectives (1964) - Grundeis
 Funeral in Berlin (1966) - Aaron Levine
 Tattoo (1967) - Auctioneer
  (1971, TV Mini-Series) - Police Inspector Bird
 Tatort (1971–1995, TV Series) - Kommissar a.D. Leo Felber / Hans Gebhardt / Dr. Gottschling
 Ein Herz und eine Seele (1973–1976, TV Series) - Alfred Tetzlaff
 Kara Ben Nemsi Effendi (1973–1975, TV Series) - Hadschi Halef Omar
 A Lost Life (1976)
  (1976) - Ferdinand Rieche
 Hitler: A Film from Germany (1977) - Zirkusdirektor / Heinrich Himmler / Himmler-Puppenspieler / Adolf Hitler
 Zwei himmlische Töchter (1978, TV Mini-Series) - Fluglotse
  (1979, TV Movie) - Leo Timpe
 Obszön – Der Fall Peter Herzel (1981) - Dr. Dieter Flake
 High Society Limited (1982) - Kolbe
 Marmor, Stein und Eisen bricht (1982)
 Konrad oder das Kind aus der Konservenbüchse (1982) - Apotheker Egon
  (1984)
 Detektivbüro Roth (1986–1987, TV Series) - Egon Fetzer
 Europa, abends (1989) - Frisör
 Stein und Bein (1991, TV Movie) - Erwin Stein
  (1993, TV Mini-Series) - Dr. Erich Fink
  (1993) - Minister Kurt Bach
 Chacun pour toi (1993) - Botha
 Zwei alte Hasen (1994–1995, TV Series) - Wille Wuttke
 Mit einem Bein im Grab (1996–1998, TV Series) - Viktor Bölkoff
 Hundert Jahre Brecht (1998)
 Silberdisteln (1998, TV Movie) - Alfons Schambeck
 The Volcano (1999) - Jewish man (final film role)

References 
 Theater im Schaufenster, Heinz Schubert, 1979,

External links 
 
 Biography, in German
 

 Ein Herz und eine Seele – Georg Seeßlen about Heinz Schubert

Sources 
This article was partly translated from the German language version of October 16, 2006

1925 births
1999 deaths
Deaths from pneumonia in Germany
Male actors from Berlin
German male comedians
German male film actors
Photographers from Berlin
German male television actors
German military personnel of World War II
20th-century German male actors
20th-century comedians
German prisoners of war in World War II